Valley Forge Christian College v. Americans United for Separation of Church and State, 454 U.S. 464 (1982), was a decision by the Supreme Court of the United States in which the court refused to expand  the Flast v. Cohen exception to the taxpayer standing rule.

The Department of Health, Education, and Welfare had disposed of surplus property by conveying it, without charge, to a church-related college.

Plaintiffs sought standing as taxpayers, and alternatively as citizens, claiming that the conveyance of property injured their right to a government that does not establish a religion.

Justice Rehnquist, writing the majority opinion, upheld the Flast test for taxpayer standing, ruling that plaintiffs lacked standing as taxpayers because they did not challenge an exercise of the Spending Clause. He also rejected the theory of standing as citizens. He held that the court is not merely a forum for "public grievances" brought by "concerned bystanders"; if it were, he reasoned, "the concept of 'standing' would be quite unnecessary".

Justice Brennan, in his dissent, criticized the general prohibition on taxpayer standing established by Frothingham v. Mellon, arguing that standing should not be denied "simply because many people suffer the same injury" or because the injury is indirect. Justice Stevens, in his dissent, called "the difference between a disposition of funds pursuant to the Spending Clause and a disposition of realty pursuant to the Property Clause", "a tenuous distinction".

See also
List of United States Supreme Court cases, volume 454
Hein v. Freedom From Religion Foundation

References

American Constitutional Law: Powers and Liberties. Massey

External links

United States Constitution Article Three case law
United States Supreme Court cases
Establishment Clause case law
United States standing case law
1982 in United States case law
1982 in religion
Valley Forge
United States Supreme Court cases of the Burger Court